Svipdagr (Old Norse:  "sudden day") is the hero of the two Old Norse Eddaic poems Grógaldr and Fjölsvinnsmál, which are contained within the body of one work; Svipdagsmál.

Plot
Svipdagr is set a task by his stepmother, to meet the goddess Menglöð, who is his "fated bride." In order to accomplish this seemingly impossible task, he summons by necromancy the shade of his dead mother, Gróa, a völva who also appears in the Prose Edda, to cast nine spells for him. This she does and the first poem abruptly ends.

At the beginning of the second poem, Svipdagr arrives at Menglöð's castle, where he is interrogated in a game of riddles by the watchman, from whom he conceals his true name (identifying himself as Vindkald(r) "Wind-Cold" apparently hoping to pass himself off as a frost giant). The watchman is named Fjölsviðr, a name of Odin in Grímnismál 47. He is accompanied by his wolf-hounds Geri and Gifr. After a series of eighteen questions and answers concerning the castle, its inhabitants, and its environment, Svipdagr ultimately learns that the gates will only open to one person: Svipdagr. On his revealing his identity, the gates of the castle open and Menglöð rises to greet her expected lover, welcoming him "back" to her.

In other material
A champion by the same name, perhaps the same character, appears in the Prologue to the Prose Edda, in Heimskringla and in Gesta Danorum. A hero named Svipdag is one of the companions of King Hrolfr Kraki.

There is also a Swæbdæg in the Anglo-Saxon Chronicle among the forefathers of Aella, King of Deira.

Interpretation
Since the 19th century, following Jacob Grimm, Menglöð has been identified with the goddess Freyja in most scholarship. In his children's book Our Fathers' Godsaga, the Swedish scholar Viktor Rydberg identifies Svipdagr with Freyja's husband Óðr/Óttar. His reasons for doing so are outlined in the first volume of his Undersökningar i germanisk mythologi (1882). Other scholars who have commented on these poems in detail include Hjalmar Falk (1893), B. Sijmons and Hugo Gering (1903), Olive Bray (1908), Henry Bellows (1923), Otto Höfler (1952), Lee M. Hollander (1962), Lotte Motz (1975), Einar Ólafur Sveinsson (1975), Carolyne Larrington (1999), and John McKinnell (2005).

Notes

References

 Orchard, Andy (1997). Dictionary of Norse Myth and Legend. Cassell. 

Heroes in Norse myths and legends
Fictional necromancers